A Moreninha is a Brazilian telenovela produced and broadcast by TV Globo. It premiered on 25 October 1965 and ended on 10 December 1965, with a total of 35 episodes. It's the second "novela das sete" to be aired on the timeslot. It was created by Moysés Weltman and directed by Otávio Graça Mello.

Cast

References 

TV Globo telenovelas
1965 Brazilian television series debuts
1965 Brazilian television series endings
1965 telenovelas
Brazilian telenovelas
Portuguese-language telenovelas
Television shows based on Brazilian novels